Olle Hellström (born 1 January 1936) is a Swedish former footballer who played as a defender. He made 127 Allsvenskan appearances for Djurgårdens IF and scored four goals. He also played international games for Team Sweden.

Honours
Djurgårdens IF
 Allsvenskan: 1959, 1964

References

Living people
1936 births
Association football defenders
Swedish footballers
Sweden international footballers
Allsvenskan players
Djurgårdens IF Fotboll players